Alpha Jet has the following meanings:
 Dassault/Dornier Alpha Jet, an advanced trainer aircraft
 Freight trains on the Alphabet Route
 αjet, Helios Airways name after rebranding